She Loves You is the third full-length album by The Twilight Singers and their first covers album. It contains covers from various kinds of music, ranging from jazz and blues to soul and R&B to rock and trip hop, and by artists John Coltrane, Skip James, Marvin Gaye, Mary J. Blige, Fleetwood Mac and Björk.

She Loves You was released in 2004 by One Little Indian Records. Food and music website Turntable Kitchen describes The Twilight Singers' takes on the source material as "lusty, smoky and simmering."

Track listing 

 "Feeling of Gaze" (Hope Sandoval) - 2:21
 "Too Tough to Die" (Martina Topley-Bird) - 4:02
 "Hyperballad" (Björk) - 4:56
 "Strange Fruit" (Billie Holiday) - 3:29
 "What Makes You Think You're the One" (Lindsey Buckingham) - 3:46
 "Real Love" (Mary J. Blige) - 4:25
 "Hard Time Killing Floor" (Skip James) - 3:15
 "A Love Supreme" (John Coltrane) - 2:03
 "Please Stay (Once You Go Away)" (Marvin Gaye) - 4:03
 "Black Is the Color of My True Love's Hair" (Traditional, arrangement Dulli) - 4:25
 "Summertime" (George Gershwin) - 2:54
 "Her Majesty" (Beatles) (bonus on LP release)

Personnel 
 Greg Dulli – vocals (all songs), guitar (1, 2, 3, 4, 5, 6, 7, 8, 9, 10), piano (1, 5, 6, 9, 10), bass (3), drums (3), dobro (7), keyboards (11), melodica (11)
 Manuel Agnelli - guitar (11)
 Joshua Blanchard - loops (6, 9)
 Scott Ford - bass (2, 4, 8, 9, 10)
 Dave Hillis - Producer/Engineer, guitar (3)
 Mark Lanegan - vocals (3, 4, 6, 7, 8)
 Bobby Macintyre - drums (2, 4, 5, 6, 8, 9), percussion (3), vocals (6, 9)
 Molly McGuire - vocals (10)
 John Nooney - piano (2, 4), keyboards (3), rhodes (8, 9)
 Mathias Schneeberger - Rhodes (10)
 Jon Skibic - guitars (2, 3, 4, 5, 6, 8, 9, 10), lapsteel (6), vocals (9), percussion (10)
 Helen Storer - vocals (3)
 Michael Sullivan - bass (5, 6)
 Jesse Tobias - dobro (7)
 Brian Young - drums/percussion (10)

References

2004 albums
The Twilight Singers albums
One Little Independent Records albums
Albums produced by Greg Dulli